Mukhtarbek Aynakulovich Aynakulov (born 13 November 1957) is a Kyrgyz actor, director and politician. He is a current member of the Supreme Council of Kyrgyzstan for the Social Democratic Party of Kyrgyzstan.

Early life and education
Aynakulov was born on 13 November 1957 in the village of Sosnovka in Chuy Oblast in the Kirgiz SSR, now Kyrgyzstan. In 1981 he graduated from the Gerasimov Institute of Cinematography, and then in 1983 he graduated from the Russian Academy of Theatre Arts with a qualification in acting and directing.

Career

Acting career
He started his career in 1983 at a theatre in the town of Przheval'sk, now known as Karakol. From 2007 until 2014, he worked in various acting studios in Bishkek, such as working as a director in "Studiya-Bishkek" and "PP Service CEZ Biskhek", before working as a leading specialist at "PP Sakchi CEZ Bishkek" for a year until his election.

Jogorku Kenesh deputy
Aynakulov was elected as deputy for the Social Democratic Party of Kyrgyzstan in the 2015 parliamentary election.

In May 2017, he was seen campaigning against the presence of independent election observers from overseeing the 2017 presidential election. Aynakulov stated that his reason for supporting such a restriction was "because they are funded by foreign donors and can influence the result of elections".

Personal life
Aynakulov is married, and has 2 children.

See also
List of members of the Supreme Council (Kyrgyzstan), 2015–present

References

Living people
1957 births
People from Chüy Region
Members of the Supreme Council (Kyrgyzstan)